The 1941–42 Gauliga Donau-Alpenland was the fourth season of the Gauliga Donau-Alpenland, formerly the Gauliga Ostmark, the first tier of football in German-annexed Austria from 1938 to 1945.

First Vienna FC won the championship and qualified for the 1942 German football championship, reaching the final where it lost 2–0 to FC Schalke 04.

The Gauliga Ostmark and Gauliga Donau-Alpenland titles from 1938 to 1944, excluding the 1944–45 season which was not completed, are recognised as official Austrian football championships by the Austrian Bundesliga.

Table
The 1941–42 season saw two new clubs in the league, Post SV Wien and SK Sturm Graz. Sturm Graz withdrew in February 1942 but kept its league place for the following season.

Results

References

External links
 Das Deutsche Fussball Archiv  Historic German league tables

Gauliga Ostmark seasons
Austria
Football
1941–42 in German football leagues